"You All Over Me" is a song by American singer-songwriter Taylor Swift featuring American singer Maren Morris. It is taken from Swift's first re-recorded album, Fearless (Taylor's Version), a 2021 re-recording of her 2008 studio album, Fearless. It was released as a promotional single from Fearless (Taylor's Version) on March 26, 2021, via Republic Records.

Swift wrote the song with Scooter Carusoe in 2005 and produced it with Aaron Dessner in 2021. It is one of six "from the Vault" tracks that were written for the original album but were scrapped before its release. Lyrically, "You All Over Me" describes the narrator's inability to move on from a romantic relationship due to her surroundings that remind her of the past. Musically, it is a sentimental country pop and roots rock ballad instrumented by acoustic guitars and harmonicas.

"You All Over Me" received acclaim from critics, who highlighted its nostalgic tune reminiscent of Swift's old country music and praised the authentic lyricism. In the United States, the song peaked at number six on Hot Country Songs and number 51 on the Billboard Hot 100. Elsewhere, it charted in the top 40 of charts in Australia, Canada, and Ireland, and on the Billboard Global 200.

Background and release
On February 11, 2021, following the dispute regarding the rights to the masters of her first six studio albums, Swift announced that the first of her re-recorded albums, Fearless (Taylor's Version), a re-recording of Swift's 2008 album Fearless, would be released on April 9, 2021. Alongside the announcement, Swift revealed she would release six songs that did not make the 2008 album, all dubbed "from the Vault". Swift explained several reasons for the scrapping of the vault tracks, including not wanting too many breakup or down-tempo songs on the album, and the limitations of how many songs could fit on CDs in 2008. In her announcement of the album, Swift wrote "I've decided I want you to have the whole story. See the entire vivid picture, and let you into the entire dreamscape that is my Fearless album." Swift originally wrote "You All Over Me" with Scooter Carusoe in 2005. A demo recording of "You All Over Me" had previously been leaked online in 2017.

On March 24, 2021, Swift announced that one of the scrapped songs, titled "You All Over Me" featuring vocals from American singer Maren Morris, would be released on March 26, 2021. On the next day, March 25, a snippet of the song was played on Good Morning America. The song was released on March 26 alongside a lyric video and "Love Story (Taylor's Version) - Elvira Remix", a dance remix of "Love Story (Taylor's Version)". "You All Over Me" was also included in Fearless (Taylor's Version): The From the Vault Chapter, a streaming compilation released by Swift on May 26, 2021, alongside the five other vault songs from the album.

Composition and lyrics
"You All Over Me" was written by Swift and Scooter Carusoe in 2005, and was intended for the original Fearless, before being scrapped. The song was produced by Swift and Aaron Dessner, a producer who had worked with Swift on her 2020 albums Folklore and Evermore. American singer and songwriter Maren Morris is featured as a background vocalist. Musically, it is an acoustic, understated country pop and roots rock ballad. The instrumentation incorporates hushed percussion, a looping sequence of synth drums at the beginning, propelling fiddles and guitars. Lyrically, the track details Swift's inability to move on from a lover, constantly being reeled back in to the memories of the relationship. The lyric "The way the tires turn stone on old county roads / They leave it muddy underneath, reminds me of you" details the messy trail left by the ending of a relationship. Some critics commented that "You All Over Me", particularly the lyric " 'Cause no amount of freedom gets you clean", served as a prequel to "Clean", the concluding track from Swift's 2014 album 1989, in which she describes finally feeling free of a romantic relationship. The song concludes with Swift accepting the end of the relationship: "I lived, and I learned / And found out what it was to turn around / And see that we / Were never really meant to be."

Critical reception
Critics praised "You All Over Me" for its authenticity and Swift's return to her country roots. Ellie Bate, writing for BuzzFeed News, described the song as a "cozy, nostalgic trip down memory lane", highlighted the similarities between the opening line and the opening line of the title track of Fearless ("There's something bout the way / The street looks when it's just rained"), and noted the fact that both lines reference rain on a sidewalk. Writing for NME, Hannah Mylrea rated the song 4 out of 5 stars and described it as "a time capsule of the Fearless era" and "musical déjà vu", comparing the song to other Fearless tracks "Come In with the Rain" and "Forever & Always". Mylrea mentioned that Dessner's production of the song "runs the Fearless soundscape through a delicate Folklore-era filter", going on to compare the opening line of the song to Swift's "The Last Great American Dynasty" and highlighting its similarities to Folklore and Evermore.

Several critics, such as Jason Lipshutz of Billboard, highlighted how the detailed lyrics and complex emotional narrative "You All Over Me" demonstrate "what set the singer-songwriter apart at a young age." Chris Willman of Yahoo! Entertainment praised the sentimental and metaphorical lyrics as a reminder of "how almost-fully-formed as a song stylist" Swift is and praising the abrasive but subliminal production. Willman further highlighted how the song was written when Swift was high school student, exhibiting Swift's long-term strength as a songwriter. Jackson Langford of MTV described the song's production and lyrics as "magical" and "intimate", comparing it to that of her alternative/folk albums Folklore and Evermore (both 2020), though felt that more country influence would have benefited the song. In a review of Fearless (Taylor's Version), Kitty Empire, writing for The Guardian, described the vault tracks as "something of a mixed bag" but picked out "You All Over Me" as a highlight, describing its nostalgic country sound as "rewarding."

Commercial performance
On the issue dated April 9, 2021, "You All Over Me" debuted at number 51 on the Billboard Hot 100, becoming Swift's 130th Hot 100 entry, extending her record as the female artist with the most songs on the chart. It also entered the Billboard Hot Country Songs at number six, scoring Swift her 25th top 10 entry on the chart and Morris's seventh; it was also the second consecutive single from Fearless (Taylor's Version) to land inside the top-10, after "Love Story (Taylor's Version)" debuted at number one. "You All Over Me" collected 9.2 million streams and sold 12,000 digital downloads in its first week, debuting atop both the Country Digital Song Sales and Country Streaming Songs charts. It is Swift's record-extending 16th chart-topper on the former and Morris's fourth. On the Rolling Stone Top 100, it debuted at number 26, selling 76,100 units and garnering 8.3 million streams in its first week; the next week, it fell to number 95 but rose to number 48 following the release of Fearless (Taylor's Version). The song also achieved success internationally, reaching number 52 on the UK Singles Chart, 35 on both the Billboard Global 200 and on the Irish Top 50 Singles charts, 34 on the Australian Top 100 Singles Chart, and 29 on the Canadian Hot 100.

Credits and personnel
Credits are adapted from Tidal.

 Taylor Swift – vocals, songwriting, production
 Maren Morris – featured artist, backing vocals
 Aaron Dessner – production, record engineering, acoustic guitar, bass guitar, drum programming, electric guitar, engineering, keyboards, percussion, piano, synthesizer
 Scooter Carusoe – songwriting
 Eric Slick – drums
 Josh Kaufman – electric guitar, harmonica
 Bella Blasko – engineering, record engineering
 Jonathan Low – engineering, mixing
 Randy Merrill – mastering
 Christopher Rowe – vocal engineering
 Greg Kurstin – vocal engineering
 Julian Burg – vocal engineering

Charts

Release history

Notes

References

2005 songs
2021 singles
2010s ballads
Country ballads
Taylor Swift songs
Maren Morris songs
Pop ballads
Song recordings produced by Aaron Dessner
Song recordings produced by Taylor Swift
Songs written by Scooter Carusoe
Songs written by Taylor Swift
Republic Records singles
Roots rock songs
Rock ballads
Country pop songs